Tyuyamunite (pronounced tuh-YOO-ya-moon-ite) is a very rare uranium mineral with formula Ca(UO2)2V2O8·(5-8)H2O. It is a member of the carnotite group. It is a bright, canary-yellow color because of its high uranium content. Also, because of tyuyamunite's high uranium content, it is radioactive. It was named by Konstantin Avtonomovich Nenadkevich, in 1912, after its type locality, Tyuya-Muyun, Fergana Valley, Kyrgyzstan.

Formation and transformation
Tyuyamunite is formed by the weathering of uraninite, a uranium-bearing mineral. Tyuyamunite, being a hydrous mineral, contains water. Yet when it is exposed to the atmosphere it loses its water. This process changes tyuyamunite into a different mineral known as metatyuyamunite Ca(UO2)2(VO4)2·3-5H2O

References

External links

Tyuyamunite at Mindat

Uranium(VI) minerals
Vanadate minerals
Orthorhombic minerals
Minerals in space group 52
Luminescent minerals
Minerals described in 1912